Nancy Collins Johnson is an American earth scientist who is the Regents’ Professor and Director of the School of Earth Sciences & Environmental Sustainability at Northern Arizona University. Her work considers soil microbial ecology and the study of mycorrhizal fungi. She was elected a Fellow of the American Association for the Advancement of Science in 2020.

Early life and education 
Johnson studied biology at the University of Minnesota. She moved to the University of Wisconsin–Madison for her graduate studies, where she majored in botany. She became interested in mutualistic symbiosis, and was encouraged by Michael Adams to explore mycorrhiza. Whilst in Wisconsin, Johnson had the opportunity to research arbuscular mycorrhizae (AM). Whilst she initially struggled to characterise the fungi she had collected from the Jackson County Iron mine, she eventually worked with Mike Miller at the Argonne National Laboratory. After graduating, Johnson returned to the University of Minnesota, where she started her doctoral studies with G. David Tilman. Her doctoral research considered the regulation of mycorrhizae and impact of fertilisers. She studied the mycorrhizae in the Cedar Creek Ecosystem Science Reserve. In 1993 Johnson showed that fertilisation of soil created AM fungal communities that are 'inferior mutualists'. Johnson continued to collaborate with her early advisor Mike Miller throughout her career, investigating the function of mycorrhizae. She was awarded an National Science Foundation postdoctoral fellowship in 1994.

Research and career 
Johnson started her independent scientific career at the Northern Arizona University, where she was made Regents' Professor in 2016. She spent 2003 as a Fulbright Program Research Fellow in Lund University and 2011 a Fulbright Program Fellow at the Czech University of Life Sciences Prague. She has applied her comprehensive understanding of AM fungi to sorghum crops.

In 2020 Johnson took a sabbatical, and was awarded a Bullard Fellowship in the Harvard Forest. Her research proposal involved a comparative study of microbiomes of AM symbioses.

Awards and honours 

 2008 Co-Chair of the International Society of Mycorrhizas
 2013 Elected Fellow of the Ecological Society of America
 2018 Ecological Society of America Deborah A. Neher Career Award
 2020 Elected Fellow of the Association for the Advancement of Science

Selected publications

Personal life 
Johnson has two children, a daughter and a son.

References 

American earth scientists
Women earth scientists
American Association for the Advancement of Science
Year of birth missing (living people)
Living people